This is a list of nationwide public opinion polls that were conducted with respect to the Republican primaries for the 2012 United States presidential election. The persons named in the polls were either declared candidates, former candidates or received media speculation about their possible candidacy.

Eleven different people were at the top of a poll at one time or the other; these were (in chronological order of earliest poll lead):Mitt Romney, Sarah Palin, Mike Huckabee, Rudy Giuliani, Newt Gingrich, Chris Christie, Donald Trump, Michele Bachmann, Rick Perry, Herman Cain and Rick Santorum.

2012 polls

2011 polls

2010 polls

Early polls

See also
Nationwide opinion polling for the United States presidential election, 2012
Statewide opinion polling for the United States presidential election, 2012
Statewide opinion polling for the Republican Party presidential primaries, 2012
Straw polls for the Republican Party presidential primaries, 2012
Republican Party (United States) presidential primaries, 2012

References

External links
 USA Election Polls
 Polling Report
 Republican Primary 17-poll average  from The Wall Street Journal

Opinion polling for the 2012 United States presidential election